Čelić is a town and municipality located in Tuzla Canton of the Federation of Bosnia and Herzegovina, an entity of Bosnia and Herzegovina.

Čelić was part of the municipality of Lopare prior to the war in Bosnia and Herzegovina. The part of the municipality that was controlled by the Army of the Republic of Bosnia and Herzegovina became the municipality of Čelić.

Geography
It is located in the hills of Majevica. Čelić borders the municipalities of Srebrenik, Tuzla, Lopare (RS) and the Brčko District.

Demographics
According to the 2013 census, the population of the municipality was 10,502 and there were 3,436 people living in the village in Čelić part. In addition to that, there were also living 35 people in the Lopare part.

Ethnic groups
The ethnic composition of the municipality:

References

Cities and towns in the Federation of Bosnia and Herzegovina
Populated places in Lopare
Populated places in Čelić